Yandu District is one of three districts of Yancheng, Jiangsu province, China. (The other two are Tinghu District and Dafeng District).

Yandu District occupies southwestern suburbs of Yancheng.

Administrative division
Yandu District is divided into 4 subdistricts and 8 towns.

4 Subdistricts:

8 Towns:

References

盐都区概况 (Yandu District overview)

External links 

County-level divisions of Jiangsu
Yancheng